Federal tribunals in the United States are those tribunals established by the federal government of the United States for the purpose of resolving disputes involving or arising under federal laws, including questions about the constitutionality of such laws.  Such tribunals include both Article III tribunals (federal courts) as well as adjudicative entities which are classified as Article I or Article IV tribunals. Some of the latter entities are also formally denominated as courts, but they do not enjoy certain protections afforded to Article III courts. These tribunals are described in reference to the article of the United States Constitution from which the tribunal's authority stems. The use of the term "tribunal" in this context as a blanket term to encompass both courts and other adjudicative entities comes from section 8 of Article I of the Constitution, which expressly grants Congress the power to constitute tribunals inferior to the Supreme Court of the United States.

Article III courts

Article III courts (also called Article III tribunals) are the U.S. Supreme Court and the inferior courts of the United States established by Congress, which currently are the 13 United States courts of appeals, the 91 United States district courts (including the districts of D.C. and Puerto Rico, but excluding three other territorial district courts), and the U.S. Court of International Trade. They constitute the judicial branch of the federal government (which is defined by Article III of the Constitution).

Pursuant to the Appointments Clause in Article II, all members of Article III tribunals are appointed by the President and confirmed by the Senate. These courts are protected against undue influence by the other branches of government. Judges may not have their salaries reduced during their tenure in office, and their appointment is for life—barring removal from office "on impeachment for, and conviction of, Treason, Bribery, or other high crimes and misdemeanors". 

Under the Constitution, Congress can vest these courts with jurisdiction to hear cases involving the Constitution or federal law and certain cases involving disputes between citizens of different states or countries.  Among the matters susceptible of judicial determination, but not requiring it, are: claims against the United States, the disposal of public lands and related claims, questions concerning membership in Indian tribes, and questions arising out of the administration of customs laws and the Internal Revenue Code.

Article I tribunals
Article I tribunals include Article I courts (also called legislative courts) set up by Congress to review agency decisions, military courts-martial appeal courts, ancillary courts with judges appointed by Article III appeals court judges, or administrative agencies and administrative law judges (ALJs). Article I judges do not enjoy the same protections as their Article III counterparts. For example, these judges do not enjoy life tenure, and Congress may reduce their salaries.

The existence of Article I tribunals has long been controversial, and their power challenged numerous times. The Supreme Court has consistently affirmed their Constitutionality, and has delineated their power on several occasions. In Murray's Lessee v. Hoboken Land & Improvement Co. the Supreme Court ruled that some legal matters, specifically those involving public rights, are inherently judicial, and thus Article I tribunal decisions are susceptible to review by an Article III court. Later, in Ex parte Bakelite Corp., the Court declared that Article I courts "may be created as special tribunals to examine and determine various matters, arising between the government and others, which from their nature do not require judicial determination and yet are susceptible of it".

Article IV tribunals
Article IV tribunals are the United States territorial courts, established in territories of the United States by the United States Congress, pursuant to its power under Article Four of the United States Constitution, the Territorial Clause. Many United States territorial courts are defunct because the territories under their jurisdictions have become states or have been retroceded.

An example of a territorial court is the High Court of American Samoa, a court established pursuant to the Constitution of American Samoa. As such, the Secretary retains ultimate authority over the courts.

Other United States territorial courts still in existence are:
 District Court for the Northern Mariana Islands
 District Court of Guam
 District Court of the Virgin Islands

Article III Court for Puerto Rico
Before 1966, the United States District Court in Puerto Rico was an Article IV court. This Act of Congress was not enacted pursuant to Article IV of the Constitution, the Territorial Clause, but rather under Article III. This marks the only occasion in United States history in which Congress has established an Article III court in a territory other than the District of Columbia. From then on, judges appointed to serve on the Puerto Rico federal district court have been Article III judges appointed under the Constitution of the United States. Like their mainland counterparts, they are entitled to life tenure and salary protection.

This important change in the federal judicial structure of the island was implemented not as a request of the Commonwealth government, but rather at the repeated request of the Judicial Conference of the United States.

The District Court of Puerto Rico is part of the First Circuit, which sits in Boston.

Supreme Court rulings limiting the power of Article I and Article IV tribunals
The concept of a legislative court was first defined by Chief Justice John Marshall in the case of American Ins. Co. v. 356 Bales of Cotton, 26 U.S. (1 Pet.) 511 (1828), which is sometimes referred to as Canter, after a claimant in the case.  In this case, a court in what was then the Territory of Florida had made a ruling on the disposition of some bales of cotton that had been recovered from a sunken ship. This clearly fell into the realm of admiralty law, which is part of the federal judicial power according to Article III of the Constitution.  Yet the judges of the Florida Territorial Court had four-year terms, not the lifetime appointments required by Article III of the Constitution.  Marshall's solution was to declare that territorial courts were established under Article I of the constitution.  As such, they could not exercise the federal judicial power, and therefore the law that placed admiralty cases in their jurisdiction was unconstitutional.

Tenure that is guaranteed by the Constitution is a badge of a judge of an Article III court. The argument that mere statutory tenure is sufficient for judges of Article III courts was authoritatively answered in Ex parte Bakelite Corp.:

[T]he argument is fallacious. It mistakenly assumes that whether a court is of one class or the other depends on the intention of Congress, whereas the true test lies in the power under which the court was created and in the jurisdiction conferred. Nor has there been any settled practice on the part of Congress which gives special significance to the absence or presence of a provision respecting the tenure of judges. This may be illustrated by two citations. The same Congress that created the Court of Customs Appeals made provision for five additional circuit judges and declared that they should [370 U.S. 530, 597] hold their offices during good behavior; and yet the status of the judges was the same as it would have been had that declaration been omitted. In creating courts for some of the Territories Congress failed to include a provision fixing the tenure of the judges; but the courts became legislative courts just as if such a provision had been included.

In Glidden Co. v. Zdanok, the court made the following statement regarding courts in unincorporated territories:

Upon like considerations, Article III has been viewed as inapplicable to courts created in unincorporated territories outside the mainland, Downes v. Bidwell, 182 U.S. 244, 266-267; Balzac v. Porto Rico, 258 U.S. 298, 312-313; cf. Dorr v. United States, 195 U.S. 138, 145, 149, and to the consular courts established by concessions from foreign countries, In re Ross, 140 U.S. 453, 464-465, 480. 

Ever since Canter, the federal courts have been wrestling with the division between legislative and judicial courts.  The Supreme Court most thoroughly delineated the permissible scope of Article I tribunals in Northern Pipeline Co. v. Marathon Pipe Line Co., 458 U.S. 50 (1982), striking down the Bankruptcy Reform Act of 1978 that created the original U.S. bankruptcy courts. The Court noted in that opinion that the framers of the Constitution had developed a scheme of separation of powers which clearly required that the judiciary be kept independent of the other two branches via the mechanism of lifetime appointments. This decision was subsequently revisited and affirmed in Stern v. Marshall, 564 U.S. 462 (2011). However, the Court noted three situations (based on historical understanding) in which Congress could give judicial power to non-Article III courts:

Courts for non-state areas (U.S. territories and the District of Columbia) in which Congress is acting as both local and national government.
Military courts (or courts-martial), under the historical understanding and clearly laid out exceptions in the Constitution.
Legislative courts established under the premise that, where Congress could have simply given the Executive Branch the power to make a decision, it has the lesser power to create a tribunal to make that decision.  This power is limited to adjudication of public rights, such as the settling of disputes between the citizens and the government.

The Court also found that Congress has the power under Article I to create adjunct tribunals, so long as the "essential attributes of judicial power" stay in Article III courts. This power derives from two sources. First, when Congress creates rights, it can require those asserting such rights to go through an Article I tribunal. Second, Congress can create non-Article III tribunals to help Article III courts deal with their workload, but only if the Article I tribunals are under the control of the Article III courts. The bankruptcy courts, as well as the tribunals of magistrate judges who decide some issues in the district courts, fall within this category of "adjunct" tribunals. All actions heard in an Article I tribunal are subject to de novo review in the supervising Article III court, which retains the exclusive power to make and enforce final judgments.

Pursuant to Congress' authority under Article IV, §3, of the Constitution to "make all needful Rules and Regulations respecting the Territory or other Property belonging to the United States"; Congress may create territorial courts and vest them with subject-matter jurisdiction over causes arising under both federal law and local law. But "the Supreme Court long ago determined that in the 'unincorporated' territories, such as American Samoa, the guarantees of the Constitution apply only insofar as its 'fundamental limitations in favor of personal rights' express 'principles which are the basis of all free government which cannot be with impunity transcended'."

The Supreme Court noted in Commodity Futures Trading Commission v. Schor, 478 U.S. 833 (1986), that parties to litigation may voluntarily waive their right to an Article III tribunal and thereby submit themselves to a binding judgment from an Article I tribunal. However, the Supreme Court later noted in Stern v. Marshall, 564 U.S. ___ (2011), that a party's right to an Article III tribunal is not always voluntarily waiveable in an Article I tribunal for suits at common law.  Similarly, in Granfinanciera, S. A. v. Nordberg, 492 U.S. 33 (1989), the Court noted that a litigant's right to jury trial under the Seventh Amendment is also not generally waivable in an Article I tribunal for suits at common law. The Supreme Court further noted in Granfinanciera and Stern the parallel analysis of rights under Article III and the Seventh Amendment.

Article IV judges, in that capacity, cannot sit on the United States Courts of Appeals or decide an appeal as part of such panels.

List of Article I, Article III and Article IV tribunals

See also

 Chapter III Court — analogous concept in Australian law
 State court (United States)
 Tribunals in the United Kingdom

References

Further reading
 
 The section on Article III is downloadable as a 1.1 MB PDF at https://web.archive.org/web/20051002211859/http://www.gpoaccess.gov/constitution/pdf/con006.pdf.
 Page 604 of this work asserts that the concept of a legislative court first appears in Canter.
 

 
 
 
United States administrative law